is a professional Japanese baseball player. He plays catcher for the Tohoku Rakuten Golden Eagles.

References 

1989 births
Living people
Baseball people from Tokyo
Kanagawa University alumni
Japanese baseball players
Nippon Professional Baseball catchers
Tohoku Rakuten Golden Eagles players